János Fuzik (10 October 1957 – 7 September 2022) was a Hungarian journalist and politician. In 2020, he was appointed Head of the Consulate General of Hungary in Esek.

Fuzik died on 7 September 2022, at the age of 64.

References

1957 births
2022 deaths
Hungarian journalists
Hungarian politicians
Slovaks in Hungary
Comenius University alumni
People from Komárom-Esztergom County